1. FC Rielasingen-Arlen is a German football club based in Rielasingen-Worblingen in the state of Baden-Württemberg. It was founded in 1999 as a merger between FV Arlen (1906) and FC Rielasingen (1919). It plays in the Oberliga Baden-Württemberg in the fifth tier of the German football league system.

The team won the 2016–17 South Baden Cup, defeating VfR Hausen 6–1 in the final. In doing so, they qualified for the first time for the DFB-Pokal. In the first round on 12 August 2017, they hosted Bundesliga club Borussia Dortmund at SC Freiburg's Schwarzwald-Stadion, losing 4–0.

Players

First Team Squad

Note: Flags indicate national team as defined under FIFA eligibility rules. Players may hold more than one non-FIFA nationality

Honours
 South Baden Cup
 Champions: 2017, 2020

References

1999 establishments in Germany
Association football clubs established in 1999
Rielasingen-Arlen 1. FC
Football clubs in Baden-Württemberg
Konstanz (district)